Jevon Demming (born 11 February 1989) in the British Virgin Islands is a footballer who plays as a defender or midfielder and was capped at full international level by the British Virgin Islands national football team.

Club career
In 2011, he signed with British Virgin Islands Championship club Virgin Gorda Ballstars.

International career
He made his international debut for the British Virgin Islands national football team on 26 March 2008 in a World Cup qualifier against the Bahamas national football team.

Demming was named captain for the two World Cup qualifier games against the US Virgin Islands national football team in 2011.

Personal life
In 2015, he was sentenced to seven years in prison for attempted murder while his cousin, Sherman Williams, received 15 years for an additional gun charge. In 2020 he lost an appeal against the conviction.

References

1989 births
Living people
British Virgin Islands footballers
British Virgin Islands international footballers
British Virgin Islands under-20 international footballers
Association football defenders